Frederic René Coudert Jr. (May 7, 1898 – May 21, 1972) was a member of the United States House of Representatives from New York from 1947 to 1959 though better known for his role in New York's Rapp-Coudert Committee.

Background
Coudert was born in New York City on May 7, 1898 to Frederic René Coudert II (1871–1955).  He attended the Browning and Morristown Schools in New York City, then entered Harvard College in 1916, but when the US entered World War I, Coudert joined the Army with a letter from former president Theodore Roosevelt. He served as a First Lieutenant in the 105th Infantry Regiment, 27th Division, with overseas service, in 1917 and 1918, graduating from Columbia University in 1918.

Coudert graduated from Columbia Law School in 1922, was admitted to the bar in 1923 and commenced practice in New York City. He served as an assistant United States attorney for the southern district of New York in 1924 and 1925.

Politics
Coudert was unsuccessful as a Republican candidate for district attorney of New York County in 1929, but was a delegate to the Republican State conventions from 1930 to 1948 and the Republican National Conventions from 1936 to 1948.

He was a member of the New York State Senate from 1939 to 1946, sitting in the 162nd, 163rd, 164th and 165th New York State Legislatures.

He was elected as a Republican to the 80th, 81st, 82nd, 83rd, 84th and 85th United States Congresses, holding office from January 3, 1947, to January 3, 1959. Coudert voted in favor of the Civil Rights Act of 1957.

He was a member of The New York Young Republican Club.

Post-congressional career
He continued his practice of law in New York City, and was also a member of the State Commission on Governmental Operations of New York City from 1959 to 1961.  Coudert was an outspoken conservative and endorsed William F. Buckley's 1965 Conservative campaign for the New York City mayoralty over liberal Republican Congressman John Lindsay.

Retirement and death
He retired due to ill health, and died in New York City on May 21, 1972.  He is buried at Memorial Cemetery, Cold Spring Harbor, New York.

Family
In 1923 he married the sculptor Mary Callery.  They had one daughter. The marriage had ended in divorce by 1930. He married Paula Murray on October 27, 1931, in New York City. He had two children in his second marriage.

See also

 Frederic René Coudert Sr.
 Rapp-Coudert Committee
 Lusk Committee

References

External links
 
 
 
 

1898 births
1972 deaths
United States Army personnel of World War I
Columbia Law School alumni
Republican Party New York (state) state senators
Republican Party members of the United States House of Representatives from New York (state)
20th-century American politicians
Morristown-Beard School alumni
Browning School alumni
Columbia College (New York) alumni